MultiGP is a global drone racing league that governs and manages radio-controlled drone racing competitions. With over 14,000 members and 544 chapters worldwide, MultiGP is the only drone racing league with clear and available methods for participation and advancement within the league. MultiGP governs and sanctions drone racing events across the world, provides turn-key race production services, and works with groups to grow the sport of drone racing.

Founded by Chris Thomas in February 2015, this drone racing league has been involved in the organization and management of over 10,000 races worldwide and created the first national (United States of America) performance-based drone racing championship. This Championship held stringent qualification requirements for entry, not just the price of admission.

MultiGP offices are located in Palm Bay, Florida.

MultiGP is a Special Interest Group (SIG) with The Academy of Model Aeronautics (AMA) and has agreed to cooperate in the communications, development, competition, and continued safety efforts of the FPV racing community within the AMA.

History 
In January 2015 Chris Thomas became involved with his local flying club, Brevard Multirotor. This group of FPV enthusiasts was holding events and races in the Brevard County region of Florida.  At the time there was a need for someone to step in and help the pilots manage video frequencies and better organize the events in the area.  Chris enthusiastically took the reins!  He created a spreadsheet and some frequency cards that helped managed the races.  In the last weeks of February 2015 MultiGP was created and started aiding local races in the Central Florida area.  The first major event MultiGP assisted with was the CFL FPV event held in Leesburg, FL the last weekend in March 2015.

Shortly thereafter in the spring of 2015, co-founding members were introduced including James Vaello as Vice President and Michael Gianoutsos as Chief Marketing Officer.  This team is credited with developing a core foundation that the organization's success would be built on. Accreditations include:

 Being awarded as the Academy of Model Aeronautic's Special Interest Group for FPV.
 Developing the first comprehensive incentive system to build and support the community from within.
 Developing the first ever true national drone racing championship with local and regional qualifiers with the assistance of Gregg Novosad.
 Defining racing classes. 
 Developing and publishing universal time-trial-tracks (UTT) with associated leaderboards to allow pilots to be ranked world-wide.
 Establishing interactive event management software to help race organizers successfully run event.
 Publishing real time track results.
 Solidifying trademarks and brands in a great competitive environment.

MultiGP developed a web-based application that would replace spreadsheet and frequency cards frequency management of video signal frequencies in order for FPV pilots fly while sharing bandwidth.  RaceSync is the proprietary software that assigns racing slots and video frequencies in real time, and allows pilots to use their smartphones to check-in when they arrive for a race and assign them a race slot and optimum video frequency that will not interfere with the other pilots in the race.

In March 2016 the software LapSync was created.  LapSync was the timing system component of MultiGP and communicates with RaceSync.  LapSync currently worked with both Trackmate and I-Lap infrared transponder systems.  In a 90-day period at the end of 2016 Lapsync counted 15,307 laps for MultiGP.

In August 2017, LiveTime FPV (livetimescoring.com) run by Cory Kroll joined MultiGP as Official Timing Partner for the MultiGP league.

LiveTime FPV works closely with MultiGP to assist MultiGP management with event content deliver and LiveTime helps chapter organizers in live event streaming, and real-time race scoring. They are improving the MultiGP Leaderboard and Application Programming Interface (API) systems to make MultiGP status tracking and record keeping more streamlined and easier to access.

Racing Classes 
Beginning in 2015, MultiGP created a set of defined racing classes which level the playing field so one pilot doesn't have an advantage over another by using more powerful equipment.  This allows the pilot's skill to win the race, not their equipment.

As of 2016 MultiGP has defined classes in Multirotors, Race Wings and Fixed Wings.

In the 2018 season the official racing class for the MultiGP Regional Series was changed to the Open Class, lifting restrictions on battery voltage.

MultiGP Universal Time Trial Tracks 
In 2015 MultiGP introduced the first Universal Time Trial Track.  Universal Time Trial Tracks allow FPV pilots to compete against each other across the world by providing standardized local courses partnered with a global leaderboard.

As of 2017 there are currently (7) different Universal Time Trial Tracks.

National Championship 
In 2016 MultiGP introduced the Regional Series and National Championship race format.  The MultiGP Regional Series allows pilots to compete on local, regional and ultimately a national level via the 2016 MultiGP Drone Racing Championships.

The first-of-its-kind performance-based drone racing championship was held at AMA headquarters in Muncie, Indiana on September 4, 2016.  Over 100 pilots arrived on-site to battle for this Championship event.

List of National Championship Winners

References 

Air racing